Mankal S. Vaidya is an Indian National Congress political activist and member of the Karnataka Legislative Assembly. He contested the 2013 Karnataka Legislative Assembly elections from Bhatkal–Honnavar assembly constituency as an Independent candidate and won polling 37,319 votes. He later joined the Indian National Congress in 2014.

On 25 February 2018, he survived an assassination attempt during a public function in Hosad village of Uttara Kannada district.

References

External links 
M. S. Vaidya affidavit

Living people
Karnataka MLAs 2013–2018
Indian National Congress politicians from Karnataka
Year of birth missing (living people)